Pizza/Fat Pizza  (titled Fat Pizza: Back In Business from season six onwards) is an Australian comedy television series created by Paul Fenech. The series premiered on SBS on 24 April 2000 where it aired for its first five seasons between 2000 and 2007 before moving to 7mate for its sixth and seventh seasons, in 2019 and 2021, respectively. The series has a spin-off feature length movie, Fat Pizza, released in 2003, and a best-of highlights video and DVD that featured previously unreleased footage and a schoolies exposé, released in 2004. In addition to this, a theatre show entitled "Fat Pizza", starring several characters from the show, toured the Australian east coast. In 2014, the storyline of the series was combined with that of Housos to create the motion picture Fat Pizza vs. Housos. The film was shown in Australian cinemas from 27 November 2014.

Through some ironic and self-conscious references, Pizza involves themes of ethnicity and stereotypes (similar to Acropolis Now), cars, sex, illicit drugs and violence to produce its dark humour. The television program is noted for its frequent cameo appearances of numerous Australian celebrities of all varieties, including actors, comedians, professional athletes and other public figures.

History and development
Pizza began in the early 1990s as a black-and-white short film entitled Pizza Man created by Paul Fenech, in which he starred as the eponymous pizza man. In 1995, the short film won third place in the Tropfest film festival. 

The subsequent television series Pizza is written and directed by Paul Fenech, who portrays the protagonist of the series, pizza deliveryman Pauly. In a few of the episodes, Pauly breaks the fourth wall and as Paul Fenech, the self-described "fil-um maker",[sic] presents featurettes that reveal the history of the series, often in a tongue-in-cheek or parody manner. It was first broadcast on the SBS network in 2000 until the fifth season in 2007. The half-hour program was part of the SBS Monday comedy slot, noted for its offbeat comedy shows including South Park and John Safran.

The Fat Pizza feature film was released in 2003 and the second Fat Pizza vs. Housos in 2014, also featured characters from another Paul Fenech comedy series Housos. 

In August 2019, it was announced the series would be returning for a new season on Seven Network’s multichannel 7mate, titled Fat Pizza: Back In Business. The season premiered on 5 November 2019. On 29 January 2020, it was announced that Fat Pizza: Back in Business had been renewed for another season. The season renewal was officially confirmed at Seven’s Upfronts in October 2020, and premiered on 8 September 2021.

Synopsis
The show focuses on the activities of Pauly and his fellow co-workers, as they deliver pizzas for "Fat Pizza", the Sydney-based pizzeria of Bobo Gigliotti, whose slogan is "they're big and they're cheesy".

Throughout the series, the dangers of pizza delivery are exemplified by encounters with aliens, killer kangaroos, bikies, bogans, petty criminals, muggers, drug dealers, addicts and/or cartels, dominatrices, celebrities, the CIA, ASIO, Australian Border Force, the Australian Taxation Office, the New South Wales Police Force, the National Rugby League, the Australian Federal Police, the Australian Army, Arab and Asian terrorists, organised crime gangs and even evil Satanic forces that conspire to bring about the end of the world. In spite of this, the characters remain unfazed and unsurprised, and they persist in their dead-end, below-minimum-wage job, which pays A$2.00 per hour.

Cast

Main characters
Paul Fenech as Pauly Falzoni – main protagonist, pizza delivery man, boxer, aspiring "fil-um maker", and (since the sixth season) the owner/manager of Fat Pizza. His favourite derogatory comment for people is "stooge", originating from a comment a teacher once made to him. Pauly has been one of Bobo's longest-serving employees at Fat Pizza and has provided Bobo with some good ideas over the years. In Series 4, Pauly's parents, relatives, and Pauly were shown with a cousin named Luigi, who lives in Italy. In several episodes, it was shown that Pauly's father was a Maltese spy for British Intelligence, and his mother was a Mexican woman whom Pauly's father had met on a boat from Hong Kong to Australia. Pauly's ethnic background consists of Maltese, Italian, and Spanish roots. He makes an appearance in an episode of Housos, telling his cousin Franky that their uncle Fred has died. In season 6, after receiving a large payout from his injuries sustained from being hit with a "coward punch", Pauly reopens the shop and becomes the manager, due to Bobo's imprisonment.
Paul Nakad as David "Sleek the Elite" Arafat – so named because he is "slicker than slick", an aspiring rapper, ladies' man and a pizza delivery man who self-titled himself the "Lebanese Lover" or "Lebanese Legend". He was the main co-star in the first two series and the movie. He is a lady killer, hence the name "Lebanese lover". In season 3, it was revealed Sleek had been kidnapped by Islamic terrorists while holidaying in his homeland of Lebanon for "rooting all their women". In several episodes, Sleek was portrayed as the closeted bisexual male. He was replaced by Rocky's other cousin, Slick, who is killed off by Bobo in the first episode of Series 3. Sleek returns in the "Fat Pizza vs. Housos" movie, where he returns to working for Bobo after spending time in Guantanamo Bay for being mistaken for a terrorist due to his rapping. In season 6, Sleek is seen running his own kebab shop, and is arrested in the finale of said season, after being mistakenly blamed for the attempted assassination of Campbell Abbott, the State Premier. For most of season 7, Sleek is seen in prison, where he shares a cell with Bubbles, a character from another Fenech TV series, Housos.
John Boxer as Bobo Gigliotti – the psychotic, pizza chef and (prior to the sixth season) the owner/manager of Fat Pizza. He has little patience and those that cross him usually end up on the wrong end of his chainsaw. He is a stingy, crooked boss, imposing dreadful working conditions and abuse. Additionally, he is consistently docking the delivery-boys' $3/hour pay for any deviation from schedule. The few things that he likes are his mother, referred to by him as Mama; his mail-order bride, Lin Chow; and making pizzas. Since Lin Chow was deported to Vietnam, Bobo has been single and, during the 2007 series of Pizza, he has recently met a former erotic film actress named Ruby a.k.a. "Mama Jugs" (Angela White), and the two have since gotten engaged, much to the disgust of Bobo's mother. Bobo makes a cameo in the Housos episode "Uncle Fred" with his trademark chainsaw. In the sixth season, Bobo is imprisoned for 25 years after the events that transpired at the end of the "Fat Pizza vs. Housos" movie. However, he gives Pauly advice about how to run the shop when he takes over from Bobo. In the second episode of the sixth season, Bobo escaped from prison, stealing the chainsaw from the shop, but returns at the end of the Series 6 finale, to rescue Pauly from Ronnie McDoggle. In Series 7, Bobo is no longer a wanted man after Pauly helps get the charges dropped, and returns to work at Fat Pizza as the chef working for Pauly. In the episode "Lino Pizza", Pauly fires Bobo after finding dismembered body parts in the freezer, belonging to customers whom he murdered with his chainsaw.
Tahir Bilgiç as Habib Halal Habib  – meaning "Friend" in Arabic. Habib featured as a supporting character in the earlier series of Pizza; a friend of Sleek's, he is a stereotypical young Lebanese (Bilgiç is actually Turkish) drug-dealer and fence of stolen goods (typically mobile phones). He played a larger role in the theatrical version of Pizza. In 2003 after the loss of Sleek, he was employed at the shop as a deliveryman, a position he regularly uses as a front for his illegal activities. He claims that he is socially inept, and used to be moderately successful with attractive women (which played a part in developing his fetish for "fat chicks" due to him being unable to get the kind of girls Sleek and Rocky picked up on a regular basis as well as Sleek and Rocky regularly cockblocking Habib from getting the attractive girls (as seen in the Fat Pizza movie)), but has hitched up with Toula.
Jason "Jabba" Davis as David "Davo" Dinkum – a stereotypical bong-smoking Aussie bogan. Being the only non-"choco" at Fat Pizza sometimes leaves him at the end of discrimination, but he gets on well with the drug-dealing Habib. Introduced in the movie, he has appeared since. Since 2005, Davo was sacked from Fat Pizza and now he is unemployed, spending most of his time smoking his bong, getting drunk and looking for chicks (the vast majority of them pot-smoking bogan chicks that reside in Hashfield). He wears thongs as training footwear.
Maria Venuti as Maria "Mama" Gigliotti – Bobo's overbearing Italian mother who actually owned Fat Pizza. Despite her being quite physically abusive, Bobo still loves his Mama and continues to live with her (with the exception of the sixth season, when he was sent to prison). Since Bobo's imprisonment, Mama has been in a state of shock and has had to be looked after by her nephew, Renzo. However, her aggressive demeanour remains unchanged.
George Kapiniaris as Ronnie McDoggle - The mascot of McDoggle's, and Pauly's arch nemesis. In the first movie, he gets into a car accident with Pauly, which results in the former kicking him in the testicles. This later caused him to not be able to have children, and over the course of the series, has additionally caused him to lose his sanity. He makes a cameo in the post-credits scene of Fat Pizza vs. Housos, plotting with fellow clowns to do a drive-by shooting on Pauly. It is later revealed that the plan was changed, and Ronnie instead coward punched Pauly. He is the main antagonist of seasons 6 and 7, in which he makes many (albeit failed) attempts to harm Pauly, or even end his life. At the end of season 7, he finally succeeds in cutting off one of Pauly's testicles.

Supporting cast 
Rob Shehadie as Robert "Rocky" Shekazbah – self-stylised "Lebanese Rambo". A tall, muscular, homophobic egotistical Lebanese friend/second cousin of Habib (often role of enforcer), seems to be able to score with any number of young (and likely underage) women.
Rebel Wilson as Toula Maccalopolous – an obese Greek-Australian girl who was Habib's girlfriend and now wife, whom she refers to as her "Habibi". She is a voracious eater. She accompanied Pauly and Rocky in the "Pizza World" mockumentary. In Los Angeles she asks a tourist centre if they have star map, but one that marks all the fast food places rather than celebrity residences. In season 4, it is revealed that Toula has a gang of obese girls called the "Fat Chick 12" (because although there are only 6 girls in the gang, they are as large as two people). It is also revealed that Toula is an obsessive control freak, domineering and controlling over every aspect of Habib's life, especially in the later stages of their engagement and after Habib married her. Before the wedding, Toula used the members of the Fat Chick 12 to spy and stop Habib from enjoying his last days of bachelorhood by preventing erotic dancers from going to Habib's buck's night. After the wedding, Toula's control over Habib has become more extreme with Toula preventing Habib from returning to work and forcing Habib to wear pink tracksuit pants. In season 5, Habib has returned to work and has successfully been avoiding Toula by saying that he is "really busy" with work.
Katrina Spadone as Katrina, or Kat for short – a best friend of the obese Toula, and girlfriend to Rocky. In the recent series of Pizza, Katrina started to develop a crush on Pauly since Rocky was not treating her right. She has broken up and re-united with Rocky several times (much to the torture and torment of Pauly who is keen on having Katrina as his girlfriend). In World Record Pizza, she joined Pauly, Habib and Kev in their trip around the globe, much to Rocky's disgust, so that Pauly can try to get Katrina. However, before they left Brazil to return to Australia, Katrina decided to stay in Brazil with her new boyfriend. She has since re-appeared, featuring in multiple episodes throughout seasons 5 and 7.
Tuyen Le as Lin Chow Bang – Bobo's diminutive mail-order bride from Vietnam. The Fat Pizza movie partly dealt with the arrival of Lin Chow (and her family), and as such she only appears in season 3, at the end of which the Department of Immigration deported her back to Vietnam, due to Habib and Rocky informing both the police and Immigration so they could avoid drug dealing charges and time in jail.
Annalise Braakensiek as supermodel Claudia MacPherson –  pronounced "Clow-dia", the name is an obvious play on models Claudia Schiffer and Elle Macpherson. She is dimwitted, rich, blonde, bulimic, and attractive. She is a regular customer at Fat Pizza and often has run-ins with both Pauly and Sleek.
Murray Harman as Officer Murray – A hot headed cop who did not like too much paper work. He seems to have many run ins with Pauly.
In seasons 6 and 7, Harman reprises his role as Officer Richard Head from Housos.
John Mangos as the newsreader.

Employees at Fat Pizza
Other employees at Fat Pizza are:
Kevin Taumata as Kev the Kiwi – A stereotypical Māori-Australian, who is obsessed with alcohol. Whenever on/off duty, he will sneak to a local pub to "git on thuh puhss." Kev often uses New Zealand slang including "choice!" and "bro". He also has a small rivalry with Junior. He is always seen with his sunglasses on. Taumata appears in Series 6 and 7, but instead reprises his role as a strikingly similar character, Kevin Takamata, from another Fenech TV series, Housos.
Andrew Ausage as Junior – Bobo's apprentice chef, who, like Bobo, abuses the other employees. He and Kev have a small rivalry, and sometimes fight each other for reasons unknown. Sometimes Junior would add Samoan-inspired ingredients on pizzas, such as pig snouts and turtle meat and cooked meat in a Hāngi. In Series 7, Junior returns after Pauly hires him as the chef of Fat Pizza, but is later fired, after repeatedly ignoring Pauly's instructions to not give away free pizzas to his relatives.
Alex Romano as DJ BJ ("BJ" standing for Big Jams) – A young employee, who is more abused and yelled at from Bobo and Junior more than the others. He enjoys playing his turn-table but is also clumsy and a weakling, resulting in occasional accidents and injuries (e.g., a snake chasing him at Uluru, being electrocuted by fiddling with plugs on Melbourne Cup Day).
Anh Do as Chen Chong Fat (a.k.a. Keith) – A stereotypical Asian, who tries to get into Australian culture, eating pies and sausage rolls and talking in outdated slang. In Season 5, he was framed for eating a police dog (Davo Dinkum, Habib and Rocky were the ones responsible for stealing the police dog, and Bobo was responsible for killing it) and was sent to jail, and was not seen after that episode.
Joe June as Jingping – The first chef to be hired at the new Fat Pizza in Series 6. He can only speak Chinese, and as such, has to communicate with Pauly via a translator. After being blackmailed by Ronnie McDoggle, he quits at the end of Series 6, in which Pauly discovers that Jingping was also an animal smuggler. At the start of Series 7, it is revealed that immediately following the events of the previous season, he helped Pauly in fleeing the country by giving him a fake passport, as well as lizards to smuggle to Wuhan, China. He is rehired later in Series 7, where he has finally learnt (albeit broken) English, and returns as the chef under the pretense that Pauly helps him with his animal smuggling by hiding several animals behind the shop.
Peter Chidiac as Jayden Brown.
Umit Bali as Umit.
Yasmin Horner as Yasmina.
Giani Leon as The Kid – A mute, BMX-riding employee who begins to work for Pauly halfway through season 7. He is shown to be a good pizza deliverer, often disappearing from view immediately after handing the customers their pizzas. He is also shown to be an excellent fighter.
Maria Tran as Suzie – Jingping's daughter, who first appears at the start of season 6, alongside her father during his job interview with Pauly. She begins working at Fat Pizza as a deliverer in season 7, at the same time as her father being rehired as the chef of Fat Pizza. Due to Pauly not being able to pronounce her Chinese name, he simply refers to her as "Suzie".

Minor characters 

 Anthony Salame as Omar, Habib's cousin and best friend of his cousin Mohammed. He was introduced in series 5, when he helped Habib do an insurance job on the old Fat Pizza premises. He is often shown to be with Habib and Rocky in most episodes. He was shown to be friends with Pauly when they went to the fireworks factory in Canberra to pick up fireworks for Habib.

Guest appearances 
Pizza has an extremely long list of guest appearances of many Australian media personalities (hence this list is incomplete). Many have recurring roles, or reappear in later episodes as entirely new characters. They also show a high degree of retroactive continuity.

Angry Anderson as a bikie, as well as an ANZAC commander in a flashback to the Battle of Gallipoli.
Chris Franklin as Dazza, a stereotypical bogan alcoholic, often seen putting up with his equally-stereotypical wife Shazza.
Anthony Mundine as himself.
Tony Mokbel as himself.
Carl Barron as a machete-wielding armed robber who attempts and fails to rob Bobo.
Nick Barker
Clementine Heath - as The Kinky Girl in the flashback Fat Batman episode
Tony Bonner as a murderous Special Air Service commander.
Bessie Bardot as Pussy Galore, a female British assassin who worked with Pauly's father in one episode of Pizza.
Richard Carter as a police detective.
Stephanie Chaves-Jacobsen as Selina, one of Sleek's numerous girlfriends.
Bob Ellis as Premier of NSW.
Michael Diamond as himself on one episode of Pizza Live.
Peter Everitt trying to steal money from Pauly for cigarettes, already has a cigarette on his ear.
Jeff Fenech as himself.
Mario Fenech as Pauly's Uncle Shiba.
Tim Ferguson as magician David Cockerfield (Fat Pizza) and Julian Bausage (Season 6).
Cornelia Frances
Kym Gyngell
Nathan Harvey as Dougie, one-time Pizza Hut mascot.
Merv Hughes as Ivan Milat.
Bill Hunter as a police detective.
Bernard King as Kenneth, Australian Taxation Office investigator.
Jack Levi (Elliot Goblet) as a Health Inspector and Driving Instructor.
Lex Marinos as Sleek's lawyer.
Margaret Pomeranz as herself.
David Stratton as himself.
Shane Porteous as a doctor who has shady connections with the illegal human organ market.
John Seru playing numerous characters, sometimes playing as a bodyguard for celebrities.
Gary Sweet
Red Symons
Robbie McGregor
Michael Veitch
Kirsty Lee Allan as Sharona, an attractive waitress who Bobo hires. She appears in only one episode, where she is eventually killed by Chong Fat in a carnival dodgem car accident.
Garry Who as Golfing Instructor, The "Stooge" Teacher and Lifesaver Les.
Jim Webb plays various characters including the bikie and Jim Smith from season 5.
Craig Ward as Stomach Rumbling Guy and Aussie Pub Guy.
Bruno Xavier as Mahatma Gandhi during many flashbacks throughout the series.
Renzo Bellato Mama Gigliotti's carer (Season 6) and Leonard the disabled nut.
Andrew Doyle as Ronnie McDoggle from 'Freaky Pizza'.
Bill Bentley various characters including Dr. Freeman (one of the golfing doctors).
Tim Shaw as a financial consultant who helps Bobo revamp Fat Pizza.

Cast and characters

Series overview

Episodes

Series 1 (2000)

Series 2 (2001)

Series 3 (2003)

Series 4 (2005)

Series 5 (2007)

Series 6 (2019)

Series 7 (2021)

Special series

Pizza Live (2004)

Pizza: Special Deliveries (2004)

The DaVinci Cup (2006)

World Record Pizza (2007)

Specials

A Real Slice of Pizza (2001)

Stage show (2016)

Feature films

Fat Pizza (2003)

Fat Pizza vs. Housos (2014)

Other appearances 
Fat Pizza: Sex, Drugs, Raps and Phones (2000): A single disc comedy album featuring sketches about Pauly, Sleek and Bobo. The album also features numerous rap songs performed by Paul Nakad (Sleek).
Pizza: The Stage Show: A live stage show that toured Australia during the series early run, featuring many of the shows performers.
Fat Pizza Fully Prank'd (20 November 2006): Shock Records WRXXX01. A compilation album of material from the banned "Fat Pizza Radio Show" and "Fat Pizza" soundtrack.

Awards and nominations 
Logie Award
2001: Most Outstanding Comedy Program (nominated)
2002: Most Outstanding Comedy Program (nominated)
2004: Most Outstanding Comedy Program (nominated)
2005: Most Outstanding Comedy Program (nominated)

Australian Comedy Awards
2003: Outstanding Australian TV Comedy – character based (nominated)

Australian Screen Sound Guild
2004: Best Achievement in Sound for a Television Program (won, for episode "School Pizza")

Filming location
In Season 1, the internal and external shots of the Fat Pizza restaurant were filmed at 322 Pacific Highway, Lane Cove. The restaurant used for filming in Seasons 2 and 3, as well as the Fat Pizza movie and live shows, was at 67 Hume Highway, Chullora. The Chullora and Lane Cove shops had actually operated as pizzerias; the Lane Cove shop still operated until 2016 (Now demolished and rebuilt as apartments) and the Chullora shop operated as a pizzeria between 2000 and 2009, but as of 2013 it had been sold and the interior stripped completely. It was re-opened as "Kyoja Dumpling" a Vietnamese dumpling take away shop but was not profitable and by 2017 the shop was empty once again. In 2006 parts of the series were filmed at the Babel Restaurant in Fairfield Heights before moving to St Johns Park in 2007.

Some episodes were also in other parts of Australia. The cast also went to Bangkok, Thailand, Mumbai, India, Amsterdam, Netherlands and Paris, France.

See also 
Fat Pizza vs. Housos
Swift and Shift Couriers
Housos
Bogan Hunters
List of Australian television series

References

External links 
 Pizza at the Australian Television Information Archive
  (2000 - 2007 show)
 IMDb Fat Pizza: Back in Business TV Series (2019– ) 

2000 Australian television series debuts
2007 Australian television series endings
2019 Australian television series debuts
2000s workplace comedy television series
2010s workplace comedy television series
Australian adventure television series
Australian comedy television series
Special Broadcasting Service original programming
7mate original programming
Television shows set in Sydney
Television series set in restaurants
Television series by Seven Productions
English-language television shows
Australian television series revived after cancellation